The Colt 70 was an open-wheel race car, based on the Lola T150, designed for USAC IndyCar racing, specifically the 1970 season. It was driven by Al Unser, and successfully won the Indianapolis 500 that year.

References 

Open wheel racing cars
American Championship racing cars